Man is the third studio album by the Welsh rock band Man and was released March 1971. It was the first album by this line-up, Terry Williams having replaced Jeff Jones on drums, while Martin Ace replaced Ray Williams on bass.

As well as a change in personnel, the album also represented a change in record label from Pye Records to United Artists (released under the UA stable "Liberty" imprint) with whom the band would remain until 1976. Reviews were mixed, particularly regarding the long tracks "Would the Christians...." and "Alchemist" which were an attempt to recreate some of the longer improvised jams that the band performed on stage, but which did not have the same impact on vinyl.

Music
The music of Man contains elements of country rock and heavy metal.

The album contained three shorter tunes: "Country Girl" that showed a clash of direction but showcases some fine Welsh harmonies. "Daughter of the Fireplace", a Leonard-penned rocker, which became a stage favourite (and highlight of Man's 1972 live LP Live at the Padget Rooms, Penarth) while "Romain", a bluesy-shuffle, was written as a reaction to Martin Ace's treatment by a Belgian police officer of the same name when he attempted to intervene in a situation at a music festival; the song remains in the Man live set to the present day.

Track listing

Personnel 
 Michael "Micky" Jones – electric guitar, acoustic guitar, vocals
 Roger "Deke" Leonard – electric guitar, acoustic guitar, piano, steel guitar, vocals
 Clive John – organ, piano, electric guitar, harpsichord, vocals
 Martin Ace – bass guitar, acoustic guitar, vocals
 Terry Williams – drums, percussion; liberty bell on "Daughter"

Production 
 Produced – Mel Baiser for Gem Production
 Engineer – George Chkiantz & Rik ??

Re-issues 
The original album was re-issued on CD in 1998 (Point PNTVP117CD)

The album was remastered and re-issued on CD in 2007 (Esoteric eclec 2012) including two bonus tracks:
 "Daughter of the Fireplace" (Single Version)
 "Alchemist" (First Version)

References

External links 
 Man - Man (1971) album review by Lindsay Planer, credits & releases at AllMusic.com
 
 Man - Man (1971) album to be listened as stream at Spotify.com
 

1971 albums
Man (band) albums
Liberty Records albums
Esoteric Recordings albums
Albums recorded at Olympic Sound Studios